Talian (or Brazilian Venetian,  but ) is a dialect of the Venetian language, spoken primarily in the Serra Gaúcha region in the northeast of the state of Rio Grande do Sul in Brazil. It is also spoken in other parts of Rio Grande do Sul, as well as in parts of Espirito Santo and of Santa Catarina.

Despite the similar names, Talian is not derived from standard Italian (usually called  or 'grammatical Italian' in Brazil), but is mainly a mix of Venetian dialects influenced by other Gallo-Italian languages as well as local Portuguese.

History

Italian settlers first began arriving into these regions in a wave of immigration lasting from approximately 1875 to 1914. These settlers were mainly from Veneto, a region in Northern Italy, where Venetian was spoken, but also from Trentino and Friuli-Venezia Giulia. In the south of Brazil these immigrants settled as smallholders in the region of Encosta da Serra. There they created three settlements: Conde D'Eu (now, Garibaldi, Rio Grande do Sul), Dona Isabel (now Bento Gonçalves, Rio Grande do Sul), and Campo dos Bugres (now Caxias do Sul). As more people arrived, the Italian settlement expanded beyond these localities. Approximately 100,000 immigrants from Northern Italy arrived between 1875 and 1910. As time went by, a uniquely southern Brazilian dialect emerged. Veneto became the basis for Italian-Brazilian regionalism.

Talian has been very much influenced not only by other Italian languages but also Portuguese, the national language of Brazil; this can be seen in the employment of numerous non-Venetian loanwords. It has been estimated that there have been 130 books published in Talian, including works of both poetry and prose.

Similar to Riograndenser Hunsrückisch (hunsriqueano riograndense), the main German dialect spoken by southern Brazilians of German origin, Talian has suffered great deprecation since the 1940s. At that time, President Getúlio Vargas started a campaign of nationalization (similar to the Nacionalismo of neighboring Argentina) to try to force non-Portuguese speakers of Brazil to "better integrate" into the national mainstream culture. Speaking Talian or German in public, especially in education and press, was forbidden.

Current status

Talian has historically been spoken mainly in the southern Brazilian states of Rio Grande do Sul, Santa Catarina and Paraná, as well as in Espirito Santo. Nowadays, there are approximately 3 million people of Italian ancestry in Rio Grande do Sul, about 30% of the local population, and approximately 1.7 million people in Espirito Santo, which accounts for 65% of the local population. All Talians adopted in the past Portuguese as their mother tongue. According to some estimates, there are up to one million Italian descendants; Ethnologue reported 4,000,000 Italian descendants in the year 2006, but these numbers do not reflect absolutely the number of Talian speakers. During the "Estado Novo" period of the government of Getúlio Vargas, the use of Talian was declared illegal. As a result of the traumas of Vargas' policies, there is, even to this day, a stigma attached to speaking these languages. In fact, the vast majority do not even understand Talian and the few people who understand a little bit of Talian have Portuguese as their mother tongue (the same thing happens with the Hunsrik language).

In 2009, the legislative assemblies of the states of Rio Grande do Sul and Santa Catarina approved laws declaring the Talian dialect to be an integral part of the historical heritage of their respective states. In 2009, the city of Serafina Corrêa, in Rio Grande do Sul, elected Talian as co-official language, alongside Portuguese. Finally, in 2014 Talian was declared to be part of the cultural heritage of Brazil (Língua e referência cultural brasileira) by the National Institute of Historic and Artistic Heritage.

Newspapers in the Talian-speaking region feature articles written in the language. There are some radio programs broadcast in Talian.

Municipalities in Brazil that have co-official Talian language

Antônio Prado, Rio Grande do Sul
Bento Gonçalves, Rio Grande do Sul
Camargo, Rio Grande do Sul
Caxias do Sul, Rio Grande do Sul
Casca, Rio Grande do Sul
Fagundes Varela, Rio Grande do Sul
Farroupilha, Rio Grande do Sul
Flores da Cunha, Rio Grande do Sul
Garibaldi, Rio Grande do Sul
Guabiju, Rio Grande do Sul
Ipumirim, Santa Catarina
Ivorá, Rio Grande do Sul
Nova Bassano, Rio Grande do Sul
Nova Erechim, Santa Catarina
Nova Pádua, Rio Grande do Sul
Nova Roma do Sul, Rio Grande do Sul
Ouro, Santa Catarina
Paraí, Rio Grande do Sul
Pinto Bandeira, Rio Grande do Sul
Serafina Corrêa, Rio Grande do Sul
Vila Flores, Rio Grande do Sul

Brazilian states with Talian as linguistic heritage officially approved statewide
Rio Grande do Sul
Santa Catarina

See also
 Italian Brazilians
 Chipilo Venetian dialect
 Venetian language
 Languages of Brazil
 Languages of South America

References

External links
YouTube video interview about Talian with Talian speaker from the town of Monte Belo do Sul, Rio Grande do Sul, Brazil.
YouTube video interview with a couple of Talian speakers from the town of Venda Nova do Imigrante, Espírito Santo, Brazil.
YouTube video radio station broadcast in Talian in the town of Serafina Correa, Rio Grande do Sul, Brazil.
 La Rena Brasil
 Portuguese essay, written by Bernardette Soldatelli Oliboni A estigmatização como fator determinante dos bloqueios de fala de descendentes de italianos no nordeste do Rio Grande do Sul ("Stigmatization as a determining impeding factor to the language of descendants of Italians in the northeast of Rio Grande do Sul")
 Main Dialects of Rio Grande do Sul
 Il "talian"
 Musibrasil
 Talian, heritage of Rio Grande do Sul 

Venetian language
Languages of Brazil
Endangered diaspora languages
Italian language in the Americas
Italian-Brazilian culture